Pampulha–Carlos Drummond de Andrade Airport  is an airport serving Belo Horizonte, Brazil, located in the neighborhood of Pampulha. Since December 16, 2004, the airport is also named after the Minas Gerais-born poet Carlos Drummond de Andrade (1902–1987).

The airport is operated by CCR.

History
Pampulha Airport was opened in 1933 as a support facility for the passenger flights operated by the Brazilian Air Force between Rio de Janeiro and Fortaleza. The first commercial operation started in 1936, when Panair do Brasil was granted a concession to fly between Rio de Janeiro and Belo Horizonte. 

In 1943 the runway was extended to 1,500m x 45m, in 1953 to 1,700m, and finally in 1961 to 2,505m.

With the great increase of traffic at Pampulha Airport, the facility became too small and unable to handle all operations. For this reason, the new Tancredo Neves International Airport was built in the adjoining municipality of Confins. The new facility was opened in 1984.

However, due to the long distance between Belo Horizonte and Confins, Pampulha remained the airport of choice for most airlines, eventually becoming overcrowded, while Confins was under-used. In order to revert this scenario, in March 2005 the government of the state of Minas Gerais with the support of agencies of the Federal government decided to restrict Pampulha to operations of aircraft with capacity of up to 50 passengers. In the months thereafter, most operations were forced to move to Confins and Pampulha gained a new vocation as a hub for regional flights and general aviation.

On 31 August 2009, Infraero unveiled a BRL8.4 million (USD4.4 million; EUR3.1 million) investment plan to upgrade Pampulha Airport focusing on the preparations for the 2014 FIFA World Cup, which was held in Brazil, Belo Horizonte being one of the venue cities. The investment was used to: build a new control tower, upgrade general aviation hangars, and enlarge the apron.

Between 1973 and 2020 the airport was operated by Infraero. On June 17, 2020, the Federal Government signed and agreement to transfer the administration of the airport from Infraero to the Government of the State of Minas Gerais. The transition period ended on December 31, 2020.

On October 5, 2021 CCR won a 30-year concession to operate the airport.

Airlines and destinations
No scheduled flights operate at this airport.

Accidents and incidents
31 May 1954: Transportes Aéreos Nacional, a Douglas DC-3/C-47A-80-DL, registration PP-ANO, en route from Governador Valadares to Belo Horizonte-Pampulha, strayed off course and struck the Cipó mountain range in cloudy conditions. All 19 passengers and crew died.
20 April 2021: a Learjet 35A of Electric Power Construção crashed during landing after a test flight. The plane had a runway excursion, breaking a perimeter fence. One of the two pilots was killed, and two other occupants were injured.

Access

See also

List of airports in Brazil

References

External links

Airports in Minas Gerais
Airports established in 1933
Belo Horizonte
1933 establishments in Brazil